The King Hussein Bin Talal Convention Centre, managed by Hilton (KHBTCC) is a convention center located on the eastern shores of the Dead Sea, near Sweimeh. It is named after the late king of Jordan, Hussein Bin Talal (1952–1999).

The KHBTCC launched in 2005. It is distanced by 65 kilometers from Queen Alia International Airport and 45 kilometers from Amman.

The KHBTCC can accommodate approximately 4,000 people. The center hosted a 2007 regional meeting of the World Economic Forum and meetings of the International Monetary Fund.

External links
 King Hussein Bin Talal Convention Center managed by Hilton website

Jordan
Event venues in Jordan
Dead Sea